Antona nigrobasalis is a moth of the subfamily Arctiinae. It is found in Guyana.

References

Lithosiini
Moths described in 1912
Moths of South America